Beudantiella is a high whorled, compressed, sparsely ribbed ammonite from the Lower Cretaceous, (Upper Albian), found in Queensland, Australia.

Beudantiella is a member of the Beudanticeratinae, a desmoceratid subfamily, and of the Desmocerataceae.  Related genera include Beudanticeras, Uhligella, and Zurcherella.

References
Notes

Bibliography
Arkell, et al. 1957. Mesozoic Ammonoidea; Treatise on Invertebrate Paleontology, Part L. Geological Society of America and University of Kansas Press.

Cretaceous ammonites
Ammonites of Australia
Albian life
Albian genus extinctions